Dead Ahead is a concert video by the Grateful Dead.  It was recorded at Radio City Music Hall in New York City on October 30 and October 31, 1980, and released in 1981.  An expanded version was released in 2005.  In contrast to other Dead concert videos, Dead Ahead contains acoustic as well as electric song performances.

Acoustic and electric tour of 1980
In September and October 1980, the Grateful Dead did a concert tour of shows with three sets each, one acoustic set followed by two electric sets.  The acoustic sets were the first the band had performed since the early '70s aside from a few rare one-off acoustic sets in special circumstances.  The tour comprised 15 shows at The Warfield in San Francisco, 2 shows at the Saenger Theatre in New Orleans, and 8 shows at Radio City Music Hall in New York.

The following year, songs from the tour were released as two live albums, the all-acoustic Reckoning and the all-electric Dead Set.

The concert video
Dead Ahead contains songs from the last two New York concerts, October 30 and October 31, 1980.  Although the video was compiled from multiple performances, and is shorter than one of the three-set concerts, it follows the general format of one of the shows, starting with some acoustic material and proceeding to a longer section of amplified music, including a somewhat edited "Drums" and "Space".

The video also includes several sketches by the comedy team of Al Franken and Tom Davis.  These are from the final night of the tour, October 31, which was hosted by Franken and Davis, and broadcast on radio and on closed circuit TV.

Different versions of Dead Ahead
Dead Ahead was released on VHS video tape and on laserdisc in 1981.  Remastered versions of the video tape and laserdisc were issued in 1995, with a running time of 1 hour 54 minutes.  In November 2005, an expanded edition of Dead Ahead was released on DVD, with a running time of 2 hours 44 minutes.

Track listing
 "Uncle John's Band" (Garcia, Hunter); Studio version
 Introduction (Franken & Davis)
 "Bird Song" (Garcia, Hunter) — acoustic; October 31, 1980
 "On The Road Again" (traditional, arranged by Grateful Dead) — acoustic; October 30, 1980
 "To Lay Me Down" (Garcia, Hunter) — acoustic; October 30, 1980
 "Ripple" (Garcia, Hunter) — acoustic; October 31, 1980
 Henry Kissinger Interview (Franken & Davis)
 "Me and My Uncle" (Phillips); October 31, 1980
 "Mexicali Blues" (Weir, Barlow); October 31, 1980
 "Ramble On Rose" (Garcia, Hunter); October 31, 1980
 "Little Red Rooster" (Dixon); October 31, 1980
 A Visit Backstage (Franken & Davis)
 "Don't Ease Me In" (traditional, arranged by Grateful Dead); October 31, 1980
 "Lost Sailor" (Weir, Barlow); October 31, 1980
 "Saint of Circumstance" (Weir, Barlow); October 31, 1980
 "Franklin's Tower" (Garcia, Kreutzmann, Hunter); October 31, 1980
 "Drums" (Hart, Kreutzmann); October 31, 1980
 "Space" (Garcia, Weir, Lesh, Mydland); October 31, 1980
 "Fire on the Mountain" (Hart, Hunter); October 31, 1980
 "Not Fade Away" (Hardin, Petty); October 31, 1980
 "Good Lovin'" (Resnick, Clark); October 31, 1980

Expanded edition bonus tracks
 "Heaven Help the Fool" (Weir, Barlow) — acoustic instrumental; October 30, 1980
 "Shakedown Street" (Garcia, Hunter); October 30, 1980
 "Samson and Delilah" (traditional, arranged by Grateful Dead); October 30, 1980
 "He's Gone" (Garcia, Hunter); October 30, 1980
 "Truckin'" (Garcia, Lesh, Weir, Hunter); October 30, 1980

Notes on the recording dates:
 Most songs were only played on either October 30 or 31, with the exception of the following which were played both days:
 Ripple. It must be from October 31, because Jerry says at the end of it "Thanks a lot, see you in a little while".
 Mexicali Blues. It must be from October 31, because it is paired with Me and My Uncle. On October 30, it was paired with Mama Tried.
 Lost Sailor-Saint of Circumstance. It must be from October 31, because they used the whole second set from that show (until Not Fade Away) with segues between each song.
 Good Lovin'. It must be from October 31, because on October 30 the drums come in earlier in the introduction. Plus Bobby hits a wrong note.
 During the acoustic sets Bill and Mickey are in different positions October 30 and October 31. On October 30 Mickey is next to Phil behind Jerry. Next day Bill is next to Phil behind Jerry.

Credits

Grateful Dead
 Jerry Garcia – guitar
 Mickey Hart – drums, percussion
 Bill Kreutzmann – drums, percussion
 Phil Lesh – bass
 Brent Mydland – keyboards
 Bob Weir – guitar

Production
 Len Dell'Amico – director
 Richard Loren – producer
 John Scher – executive producer
 Dan Healy and Betty Cantor-Jackson – audio mix
 Candace Brightman – lighting and set design
 Thom Drewke – technical supervisor
 Veronica Loza – editor and production coordinator
 Dennis Larkins and Peter Barsotti – cover art
 Al Franken and Tom Davis – hosts

References

Metzger, John. Dead Ahead review, The Music Box, November 2005, Volume 12, #11
Scott, John W; Dolgushkin, Mike; Nixon, Stu. DeadBase XI: The Complete Guide to Grateful Dead Song Lists, 1999, DeadBase, 

Concert films
1981 films
Grateful Dead video albums
Albums recorded at Radio City Music Hall
1980s English-language films